Hear My Heart is the second album of the Filipino singer, actress, host, model and Myx VJ Nikki Gil.

Track listing
All tracks were produced by Francis Guevarra.

Album credits

 Christopher Sy – executive producer
 Estela Paz Cachapero – domestic label manager
 Francis Guevarra – producer
 Efren San Pedro & Ramil Bahandi – vocals recorded
 Arnie Mendaros – vocal arrangements
 Nikki Gil – back ups
 Arnie Mendaros – back ups
 Ferdie Marquez – mixed & mastered
 Willie A. Manzon – creative Consultant
 Patrick Uy – styling
 Ken & Roman – hair & make-up
 Mark Nicdao – photography
 Abi Goy – album design & illustration

References

2008 albums
Nikki Gil albums